Luz del Carmen Zasso Paoa is a Chilean Mestizo Rapa Nui politician, Mayor of Easter Island between 2008 and 2012.

She got a degree in Construction Engineering for the University of Viña del Mar. Since 2015 is the General Manager of Sasipa, the company that distributes electricity to the island.

References

Living people
Women mayors of places in Chile
Chilean engineers
Rapanui politicians
Easter Island people
Year of birth missing (living people)